Patrick O'Donnell (born February 25, 1966) is an American educator and politician who served in the California State Assembly. He is a Democrat who represented the 70th Assembly District, which encompassed the Los Angeles Harbor Region and portions of Long Beach.

Prior to being elected to the Assembly in 2014, he was a Long Beach City Councilmember and a teacher.

On January 5, 2022, O'Donnell announced that he would not be a candidate for reelection.

2014 California State Assembly

2016 California State Assembly

2018 California State Assembly

2020 California State Assembly

References

External links 

 
 Campaign website
 Join California Patrick O'Donnell

Democratic Party members of the California State Assembly
Living people
1966 births
People from Long Beach, California
21st-century American politicians
California State University, Long Beach alumni
California city council members